Saket Modi (born July 31, 1990) is an entrepreneur, co-founder and CEO of Safe Security, a cybersecurity and digital business risk quantification company, based out of Palo Alto, California.

Early life 
Modi is born and raised in Kolkata, India. His father is a businessman. He attended school at Lakshmipat Singhania Academy. In school, Modi was often found in the computer laboratory and it is there that he realised he could access the chemistry question paper stored in a password protected file. By using a simple ‘brute force’ tool, which was available for free on the Internet, he was able to unlock the paper. He later confessed to his teacher but this small incident helped Modi realize that he could use his skills for social good. In 2012, he received his undergraduate engineering degree from the LNM Institute of Information Technology, Jaipur with a major in computer science. As an undergraduate student, Saket conducted several hands-on workshops on ethical hacking at Indian Institutes of Technology (IIT) campuses across India.

Career 
In 2012, while in his fourth year of college, Saket Modi, Vidit Baxi and Rahul Tyagi started Lucideus (now known as Safe Security) at the incubation center in IIT Bombay, using capital from their personal savings and family. In 2013, Lucideus opened its first office in New Delhi. The company was known for doing a security assessment of the BHIM, an Aadhaar-based mobile payment platform designed by the National Payments Corporation of India.

In 2017, Lucideus secured its initial round of funding with $2 million from Sri Shivananda (CTO, PayPal), Rajan Anandan (Managing Director, Sequoia Capital), Victor Menezes (ex-Senior Vice-chairman, Citibank), Vikas Agnihotri (Operating Partner, Softbank Group), Mickey Doshi (CEO, Credit Suisse, India), among others.

In 2018, Cisco's former Chairman and CEO John T. Chambers led an investment round of $5 million through JC2 Ventures to invest in Lucideus. Chambers asked Modi to describe his business in 15 seconds and was hooked by the reply.

In 2019, Lucideus expanded its operations to the USA and other markets in the APAC region, and shifted their headquarters to Palo Alto, California.

Public appearances 

Modi has appeared as a guest on television programs including CNBC, Fortune (magazine), Forbes, and Bloomberg. Also, he has spoken on various subject of information security and entrepreneurship at international forums like Mobile World Congress, CeBIT, Confederation of Indian Industry, ISACA, TiE, TED (conference), etc.

Awards and honours

References 

Living people
Indian businesspeople
1990 births
Indian technology company founders
Indian chief executives
21st-century Indian businesspeople
Businesspeople from Kolkata
Indian expatriates in the United States
Businesspeople from California